Heptaminol is an amino alcohol which is classified as a cardiac stimulant (positive inotropic action).  It also increases coronary blood flow along with mild peripheral vasoconstriction. It is sometimes used in the treatment of low blood pressure, particularly orthostatic hypotension as it is a potent positive inotrope (improving cardiac contraction).

Use in doping
Heptaminol is classified by the World Anti-Doping Agency as a doping substance. In 2008, the cyclist Dmitriy Fofonov tested positive for heptaminol at the Tour de France. In June 2010, the swimmer Frédérick Bousquet tested positive. In 2013, the cyclist Sylvain Georges tested positive at the Giro d'Italia. In 2014, baseball player Joel Piniero tested positive as well as St. Louis Cardinals minor league baseball player Yeison Medina.

On March 22, 2019, Cycling South Africa reported that Ricardo Broxham has been sanctioned for an anti-doping rule violation of Articles 2.1 and 2.2 of the UCI Anti-Doping Rules after an in-competition test conducted on 18 August 2018 confirmed the presence of Heptaminol in his sample.

The UCI Anti-Doping Tribunal has imposed a period of ineligibility of 12 months for the violation, applicable as of 22 September 2018 up to and including 22 September 2019 and a disqualification of all results from the 2018 UCI Junior Track Cycling World Championships.

See also 
 Isometheptene
 Methylhexanamine
 Tuaminoheptane

References 

Vasodilators
Amines
Tertiary alcohols